Samuel Walter Hunt (9 January 1909 – 2 August 1963) was an English professional footballer who played in the Football League for Lincoln City, Mansfield Town, Torquay United, Rochdale, Stockport County, Accrington Stanley and  Carlisle United.

Hunt was also a cricketer who played for Derbyshire in 1936.

Hunt was born in the Derbyshire village of Doe Lea. Hunt made his debut for Derbyshire in the 1936 season in a match against Northamptonshire in May when he made his top score of 17 in his single innings. He played sporadically during Derbyshire's only County Championship-winning season and was never on the losing side of a Derbyshire match.

Hunt was a right-handed middle-order batsman who played 5 innings in 5 first-class matches. His top score was 17 and his average 9.6. He was a leg-break bowler who bowled 1 over without taking a wicket.

In 1950 for one season, Hunt represented Northumberland in the Minor Counties Championship.

Hunt died at the age of 54 in Rochdale.

References

External links
Samuel Hunt at CricketArchive 

1909 births
1963 deaths
People from Bolsover District
Footballers from Derbyshire
English footballers
Association football forwards
Welbeck Welfare F.C. players
Lincoln City F.C. players
Mansfield Town F.C. players
Torquay United F.C. players
Rochdale A.F.C. players
Rochdale A.F.C. wartime guest players
Stockport County F.C. players
Accrington Stanley F.C. (1891) players
Carlisle United F.C. players
English Football League players
English cricketers
Derbyshire cricketers
Northumberland cricketers